A list of films produced by the Marathi language film industry based in Maharashtra in the year 1921.

1921 Releases
A list of Marathi films released in 1921.

References

External links
Gomolo - 

Lists of 1921 films by country or language
1921
1921 in Indian cinema